Ernst Friedrich von Mohl (July 20, 1849 – January 8, 1929) was a German classical philologist and professor.

Mohl studied philosophy at the University of Tübingen and became a member of Landsmannschaft Schottland. It was during this time that he became a lifelong friend of Alexander von Zagareli. Later he studied at the University of Dorpat. From 1889 to 1911 he was professor at the Saint Petersburg Law School. 

He died in Munich in 1929.

German classical philologists
Recipients of the Order of St. Vladimir, 4th class
Recipients of the Order of St. Anna, 2nd class
University of Tübingen alumni
University of Tartu alumni
People from the Kingdom of Württemberg
1849 births
1929 deaths
Von Mohl family